Presidency of Akbar Hashemi Rafsanjani was the 5th and 6th government of Iran after Iranian Revolution. At that time, Akbar Hashemi Rafsanjani was the president.

Rafsanjani's Presidency
Rafsanjani adopted an "economy-first" policy, supporting a privatization policy against leftist economic tendencies in the Islamic Republic.  Another source describes his administration as "economically liberal, politically authoritarian, and philosophically traditional" which put him in confrontation with more radical deputies in the majority in the Majles of Iran.

Domestic policy
Rafsanjani advocated a free-market economy. With the state's coffers full, Rafsanjani pursued an economic liberalisation policy. Rafsanjani's support for a deal with the United States over Iran's nuclear programme and his free-market economic policies contrasted with Mahmoud Ahmadinejad and his allies, who advocate maintaining a hard line against Western intervention in the Middle East while pursuing a policy of economic redistribution to Iran's poor. By espousing World Bank inspired structural adjustment policies, Rafsanjani desired a modern industrial-based economy integrated into the global economy.

Rafsanjani urged universities to cooperate with industries. Turning to the quick pace of developments in today's world, he said that with "the world constantly changing, we should adjust ourselves to the conditions of our lifetime and make decisions according to present circumstances". Among the projects he initiated are Islamic Azad University.

During his presidency, a period in which Rafsanjani is described by western media sources as having been the most powerful figure in Iran, the judicial system of Iran executed political dissidents, drug offenders, Communists, Kurds, Bahá'ís, and clerics.

Foreign policy
Following years of deterioration in foreign relations under Khomeini during the Iran-Iraq war, Rafsanjani sought to rebuild ties among Arab states, as well as with countries in Central Asia, including Azerbaijan, Turkmenistan and Kazakhstan. However, relations with European countries and the United States remained poor, even though Rafsanjani has a track record of handling difficult situations and defusing crises.

He condemned both the United States and Iraq during the Persian Gulf War in 1991. After the war he strove to renew close ties with the West, although he refused to lift Khomeini's fatwa against the British author Salman Rushdie.

Rafsanjani has said that Iran is ready to assist Iraq, "expecting nothing in return". On the other hand, he has said that "peace and stability" is a function of the "evacuation of the occupiers."

Iran gave humanitarian help to the victims of the conflict. Iran sent truck loads of food and medicine to Iraq and thousands of Kuwaiti refugees were given shelters in Iran.

Rafsanjani voiced support to Prince Abdullah's peace initiative and to "everything the Palestinians agree to". He was also clear that Iran's international interests must take precedence over those of Iranian allies in Syria and Lebanon.

Rafsanjani is a supporter of Iran's nuclear program. In 2007 Rafsanjani reiterated that the use of weapons of mass destruction was not part of the Islamic Republic culture. Rafsanjani said: "You [US and allies] are saying that you cannot trust Iran would not use its nuclear achievements in the military industries, but we are ready to give you full assurances in this respect."

Currency crisis
During 1990–95, Rafsanjani's administration faced the brunt of the second-generation US economic sanctions. He failed to stop the Iranian rial from plunging 80% in value from 415 to 2,046 to the US dollar, triggering the rise of the modern underground and barter economic networks.

Members of the cabinet

References

See also

Cabinet of Iran

Akbar Hashemi Rafsanjani
1989 establishments in Iran
1997 disestablishments in Iran
Hashemi Rafsanjani